Taeniapterinae is a subfamily of flies in the family Micropezidae. There are at least 9 described species in Taeniapterinae.

Genera
 Calobatina Enderlein, 1922
 Grallipeza Rondani, 1850
 Hoplocheiloma Cresson, 1926
 Rainieria Rondani, 1843
 Taeniaptera Macquart, 1835

References

Further reading

External links

 Diptera.info
 NCBI Taxonomy Browser, Taeniapterinae

Micropezidae
Brachycera subfamilies